Monchel-sur-Canche (literally Monchel on Canche) is a commune in the Pas-de-Calais department in the Hauts-de-France region of France.

Geography

Population

Places of interest
 The fifteenth century church of "St Juste", who is the patron saint of farmers.

References

Monchelsurcanche